Öbergs på Lillöga  was a Swedish television series, set in archipelago environment, that aired in 1983.

Cast
Catharina Alinder as Eva Öberg
Sickan Carlsson as Britta
Stig Engström as Stig Öberg
Stig Grybe as Carlsson
Benny Haag as Bosse Öberg
Karl-Arne Holmsten as Shop Keeper
Jan-Eric Lindquist as Fritiof
Lena Strömdahl as Margit Öberg

See also
List of Swedish television series

External links

1983 Swedish television series debuts
1983 Swedish television series endings
Swedish drama television series
1980s Swedish television series